Kuiper is a Dutch surname.

Kuiper may also refer to a number of items named after the Dutch-American astronomer Gerard Kuiper:
 Kuiper (lunar crater), located in the Mare Cognitum
 Kuiper (Martian crater), an impact crater in the Phaethontis quadrangle of Mars
 Kuiper (Mercurian crater), moderate sized, very young crater on Mercury
 Kuiper Airborne Observatory, NASA research facility for infrared astronomy
 Kuiper belt, an area of the solar system extending past the orbit of Neptune 
 Pluto Kuiper Express, a proposed NASA mission replaced by New Horizons
 Project Kuiper, a planned satellite internet constellation by Amazon
 1776 Kuiper, an asteroid

See also 

 
 
 Kuipers, a surname
 De Kuyper, a surname
 Quipper (disambiguation)
 Kipper (disambiguation)